"Stormy Monday" is the common shortened form of "Call It Stormy Monday (But Tuesday Is Just as Bad)", a blues standard by T-Bone Walker.

Stormy Monday may also refer to:

"Stormy Monday Blues", a 1942 jazz song by Earl Hines and Billy Eckstine
 Stormy Monday (Lou Rawls album), 1962
 Stormy Monday Blues (album), T-Bone Walker, 1968
 Stormy Monday (Kenny Burrell album), 1978
 Stormy Monday (film), a 1988 film